Lisa Fritsche (born 28 April 1993) is a German slalom canoeist who has competed at the international level since 2010.

She won two medals in the K1 team event at the ICF Canoe Slalom World Championships with a gold in 2017 and a silver in 2018. She also won a gold and a silver medal in the same event at the European Championships.

References

External links

German female canoeists
Living people
1993 births
Medalists at the ICF Canoe Slalom World Championships